The men's volleyball tournament at the 2022 Mediterranean Games was held from 26 June to 4 July at the Hamou Boutlélis Sports Palace in Oran, Algeria.

Participating teams

 (host)

Venues

Preliminary Round 
All times are local (UTC+1).

Group A 

|}

|}

Group B 

|}

|}

Group C 

|}

|}

Final round

Classification bracket

Classification 5th–8th

|}

Seventh place game

|}

Fifth place game

|}

Championship bracket

Quarterfinals

|}

Semifinals

|}

Third place game

|}

Final

|}

Final standings

See also

Volleyball at the Mediterranean Games
Volleyball at the 2022 Mediterranean Games – Women's tournament

References

External links
2022 Mediterranean Games

Sports at the 2022 Mediterranean Games
Mediterranean Games